Wayside, Texas may refer to:

Wayside, Lynn County, Texas
Wayside, Roberts County, Texas
Wayside, Armstrong County, Texas